Woollyheads is a common name for several plants and may refer to:

Craspedia, also known as billybuttons
Nemacaulis, also known as cottonheads
Psilocarphus